Joseph Lewis Black (born 23 December 1989) is a British musician and drag queen from Brighton, England. He is best known for competing on the second series of RuPaul's Drag Race UK and getting eliminated first and fifth, after being voted back on to the show in episode five.

Career 
Black has fulfilled his career as a drag queen since 2008, and has become one of the leading figures in the dark cabaret genre of drag. He regularly performs in Brighton (in which he resides) and often performs at the annual Brighton Fringe festival. Black has cited his love of music as one of the main reasons he's kept on pursuing his career, he often plays the piano, accordion, musical saw, ukulele and theremin at his performances. Black has toured extensively across the UK, Europe, Australia and America for more than a decade. This included a UK tour with season 9 contestant of RuPaul's Drag Race, Sasha Velour.

In December 2020, Black was announced as one of twelve contestants competing on the second series of RuPaul's Drag Race UK. Black was the first contestant eliminated in a lip sync challenge against contestant Bimini Bon-Boulash to the song "Relax" by Frankie Goes to Hollywood. However, Black returned in episode five when the previously eliminated queens return (excluding Ginny Lemon) and won his spot back in the competition after the contestants voted to bring him back. Black was again eliminated following a lip sync challenge against contestant Tia Kofi to the song  "Don't Leave Me This Way" by The Communards. He is the first contestant to return after being eliminated on RuPaul's Drag Race UK. Since his elimination, Black has announced a UK Tour titled Decopunk planned for September 2021, as well as the release of a 40% ABV limited edition gin of the same name. In February 2022, Black will embark on RuPaul's Drag Race UK: The Official Tour alongside the entire cast of the second series of RuPaul's Drag Race UK, in association with World of Wonder and promoter Voss Events.

Personal life 
Black has spoken openly about having and living with Tourette's Syndrome, on multiple occasions.

Filmography

Television

Music videos

Discography

As featured artist

Stage

References

External links 
 

1989 births
Living people
20th-century LGBT people
21st-century LGBT people
British cabaret performers
Dark cabaret musicians
English drag queens
Gay entertainers
LGBT cabaret performers
Musicians from Brighton and Hove
Musicians from Portsmouth
People with Tourette syndrome
RuPaul's Drag Race UK contestants